Select Sport A.S. is a Danish sports equipment manufacturer based in Glostrup, Denmark.

As of 2008, Select Sport provides the Danish Football Association with footballs, and also several clubs in the Danish, Belgian, Portugal and Russian top football leagues use Select balls.

Select also provides the Official Matchball for the Germany Bundesliga and Bundesliga 2 with Derbystar form 2018/19 season 

Select balls are used in the Olympic handball games, as well as in the World Championship and in the Danish, Swedish and Spanish men's handball leagues, among others.

The company's U.S. subsidiary, Select Sport America, has contracts to supply soccer balls for the United Soccer League, National Premier Soccer League, NAIA, several NCAA Division II and Division III conferences, and state high school federations in Kentucky and Wisconsin.

History
It was founded in 1947 by Eigil Nielsen, the former goalkeeper of the Danish national football team.

In 1962, Select manufactured and marketed the first 32-panel ball. Based loosely on the geodesic dome designs of R. Buckminster Fuller, it consisted of 12 black pentagons and 20 white hexagons. The 32 panel configuration became the world standard for several decades. Select was also the first manufacturer of footballs without exterior lacing.

Products
Select Sport manufactures and commercializes a variety of products for several sports. The following chart contains all the product lines by the company.

Sponsorships
Select Sport is the official supplier and sponsor of numerous teams, players and associations of several sports, including:

Football

National teams

Associations and competitions
Select is official ball supplier for the following football leagues/associations:

  Jupiler Pro League
  BH Telecom Premier League
  Danish Football Federation
 ALKA Superliga
 NordicBet Liga
 Denmark national football team
  Fortuna liga
  Veikkausliiga
  Deutsche Fußball Liga
 Bundesliga
 2. Bundesliga 
  Úrvalsdeild
  Eredivisie
  Norwegian Football Association
 Eliteserien
 Mesterfinalen
 Toppserien
  I liga
  Liga Portuguesa de Futebol Profissional
 Primeira Liga
 Liga Portugal 2
 Taça da Liga
  Liga I
  Swedish Football Association
 Allsvenskan
 Superettan
  Professional Football League of Ukraine
  United Soccer League 
  National Premier Soccer League
  Women's Premier Soccer League
  United Women's Soccer
  NAIA
  NJCAA
  Singapore Premier League

Club teams

 Avarta
 Birkerød
 Gentofte-Vangede Idrætsforening
 07 Vestur
 Kakamega Homeboyz
 Hønefoss
 Moss
 Tromsø  (Since 2016)
 Fanja  (Since 2016)
 Brage  (Since 2015)
 GAIS
 Kalmar 
 Sirius 
 Utsiktens BK 
 Örebro SK

Handball

National teams

Club teams
 GOG
 Cavigal Nice
 Dijon Métropole
 Grand Nancy Métropole
 Plan-de-Cuques
 Sélestat Alsace
 Valence
 TSV Bayer Dormagen

Former sponsorships
In the past, Select S / A has also been a supplier to important sports teams and associations, including:

National teams

Notes

References

External links
 Official website 
 Official USA website
 Unofficial website 

Sportswear brands
Sporting goods manufacturers of Denmark
Manufacturing companies based in Copenhagen
Companies based in Glostrup Municipality
Danish companies established in 1947